Matt Winson is a Dutch indie folk band formed in 2015. The band consists of Matthijs Steur (lead vocals), Pieter van Winsen (guitar, keys, banjo, mandolin, backing vocals), Thomas van Winsen (drums, backing vocals), and Maikel Warmerdam (guitar, sampling).

The band released their debut album Woodfalls in 2017 on V2 Records Benelux, reaching #66 in the Dutch album charts. On February 8, 2017 Matt Winson made their television debut performing in Dutch TV-Show De Wereld Draait Door.

Discography

Studio albums

References 

Dutch pop music groups